Ali Kararname is a government decree issued in 1867 allowing state officials to close down newspapers which they felt posed a threat to the regime.

Etymology 

Kararname is a word from the Turkish language, meaning a government decree.

Purpose and result 

It was the first serious attempt by the government to restrict publications which published material opposing the governing elite. This decree was issued by Ali Pasha and later became known by his name. It did not succeed in its attempt to suppress the publication of the periodical publications; they became more numerous than ever.

References 

Politics of the Ottoman Empire
Tanzimat
Ottoman law